Death Is Certain is the second studio album by American rapper Royce da 5'9". It was released on February 24, 2004, through Koch Records. Recording sessions took place from December 2002 to January 2004 at Isolation Records, at Nation Studios in Detroit, and at MPA Studios. The majority of the album's production was handled by Carlos "6 July" Broady of Bad Boy Records production team The Hitmen. Other producers contributed to the album are Jason "Asar" Qualls, Ty Fyffe, Rob "Reef" Tewlow, Mark Bassin, and DJ Premier, who produced the album's lead single "Hip Hop". It features guest appearances from Ingrid Smalls, 6 July, Cha Cha and Cutty Mack. The album peaked at number 161 on the Billboard 200 and number 39 on the Top R&B/Hip-Hop Albums.

Background
Released two years after his official debut Rock City, Royce spent his two-year hiatus entangled in a beef with fellow Detroit natives and former allies, D12. Due in part to a battle with depression, Death Is Certain features a sound considerably darker than that heard on his debut. Royce's new sound garnered him considerable acclaim for the album, with most critics calling Death Is Certain his strongest effort. The album is also noted by many listeners to contain both 2Pac and The Notorious B.I.G. influences in Royce's lyrics.

Later, Royce said he can't listen to the album because it takes him "to a dark place and a dark time". About the process during the production of it: "I like the fact that album happened. It taught me a lot about the creative process. I had no choice but to be honest. I didn't go into that album the way I go into albums now, where I know exactly what I need to be doing as an artist. I know not to reach for anything, to just be myself. To be honest and be transparent, that's what I like to do. That's what I feel will resonate the best. That's what I did with Death Is Certain, but I didn't plan to. It was like I was stuck in that mode. I was going through so much. We actually did that album, me and Six July, we did that album in like two weeks. Six of those songs I did within the first couple of days. That was the first batch of beats he played me. I remember they went to the titty bar, and I was just writing all of them. Knocking them down real quick. It was like, so much on my mind, I don't even think I was focused on being super lyrical. [laughs] I was just spilling. Just spilling shit. And I was super drunk".

Critical reception

Death Is Certain was met with generally positive reviews. At Album of the Year, which assigns a normalized rating out of 100 to reviews from professional critics, the album received an average score of 70, based on four reviews.<ref name="AOTY">{{Cite web|title=Royce da 5'9 - Death Is Certain|url=https://www.albumoftheyear.org/album/52874-royce-da-59-death-is-certain.php|access-date=October 6, 2020|website=Album of the Year|language=en-US}}</ref> About the critical acclaim, Royce said: "For the album to have that type of reaction, to resonate with people like that...It just gave me an idea-- when we come in the game, everything is trial and error. It's going to be from making mistakes. Death Is Certain'' was a situation where I learned from something that was successful. Most of the shit I know now, I learned from making mistakes. Most of my valuable lessons came from making mistakes".

Track listing

Sample credits
"Regardless" samples "Love and Happiness" by Al Green and contains re-sung elements of Lose Yourself by Eminem 
"Hip Hop" samples "Overture" by Jerry Goldsmith
"I & Me" contains re-sung elements of "Against All Odds" by 2Pac
"T.O.D.A.Y." samples "Ike's Mood 1" by Isaac Hayes and contains re-sung elements of "B.I.G. Interlude" by The Notorious B.I.G.
"Beef" contains re-sung elements of "What's Beef" by The Notorious B.I.G.

Charts

References

External links

2004 albums
E1 Music albums
Royce da 5'9" albums
Albums produced by Ty Fyffe
Albums produced by DJ Premier